Dinah Shtettin (a.k.a. Dina Stettin and Dinah Feinman; c. 1862—1946) was an English-born Yiddish theater actress. She was the second wife of Jacob Adler, with whom she had a daughter, Celia in 1889; the couple divorced shortly thereafter. Despite acrimony between them, Shtettin went on to perform with Adler's troupe on the American Yiddish stage.

Early life
The daughter of Polish Jews, Shtettin had a strict Orthodox Jewish upbringing in London. She began her theatrical career as a teenager in the chorus of Israel Grodner's London troupe in the mid-1880s, eventually winning small parts and joining the troupe when the Grodners went to Paris. Jacob Adler, then a widower, quickly took a liking to her. At this time, he was already involved with Jenny ("Jennya") Kaiser, whom he had become romantically involved with while his first wife, Sonya, was still alive and with whom he shared a son, Charles.

Dinah Shtettin's father approved neither of theater nor of Adler, but did little to restrict his daughter's wishes. He stated, "Let it be a divorce tomorrow, but marriage it must be!"  The couple married in 1887, after which Adler left with the troupe to travel to the United States. After a return to London for seven months, he once again journeyed to New York in 1889 and was shortly followed by Dinah. Their daughter Celia was born in New York later that year. Shtettin divorced Adler when he ran off with Sara Heine two years later in 1891.

Shtettin married actor Siegmund Feinman and together they raised Celia, who took her stepfather's surname along with her father's, eventually becoming a leading actress on the Yiddish stage. Shtettin and Feinman's daughter, Lillie Feinman married Yiddish actor Ludwig Satz.

Stage career
Dinah Shtettin's New York debut was in the role of Fanya, the villain's daughter, in Jacob Gordin's Siberia (1892). Commercially unsuccessful at the time, this first play of Gordin's is now considered a landmark in the evolution of Yiddish theater.

References

External links
Adler Family Papers.; P-890; American Jewish Historical Society, Boston, MA and New York, NY.

1862 births
1946 deaths
Year of birth unknown
Actresses from London
English Jews
English people of Polish-Jewish descent
English stage actresses
Yiddish theatre performers